Zdenko Matthew "Zed" Seselja (born 27 March 1977) is an Australian politician who was a Senator for the Australian Capital Territory from 2013 to 2022, representing the Liberal Party. He was the Minister for International Development and the Pacific in the Morrison Government from December 2020 to May 2022, and previously served as an assistant minister in the Morrison and Turnbull Governments since 2016.

Seselja was previously a member of the Australian Capital Territory Legislative Assembly from 2004 to 2013, and served as leader of the Canberra Liberals and Leader of the Opposition from 2007 to 2013.

Early life and education
Seselja was born in Canberra Hospital, to parents Ljudevit and Katica Seselja, both of whom emigrated separately from Croatia (when it was part of Yugoslavia). His mother arrived alone in late 1970, and five months later she married Ljudevit, who had arrived three years earlier. Both held two jobs each.
 
Seselja attended St Mary MacKillop College. He graduated from the Australian National University with a Bachelor of Arts degree in 1997, a Bachelor of Laws degree in 1999 and a Graduate Diploma in Legal Practice in 2002. He received a Graduate Certificate in Public Administration in 2000 from the University of Canberra. He was admitted as a legal practitioner in 2002.

While attending university, he worked at Woolworths Supermarkets from 1995 to 1998; at MacKillop Catholic College (now St Mary MacKillop College) in 1998 as a cleaner; at the Australian Fisheries Management Authority from 1998 to 1999 as a legal assistant; and at the Commonwealth Department of Transport and Regional Services from 2000 to 2004 as a policy officer, lawyer, and then a senior lawyer.

Political career

Australian Capital Territory
At the 2008 election, Seselja received a quota of 1.49 and was elected first in the seven-member Molonglo electorate. There was a decrease in the vote for both major parties, with a swing to the Greens. Labor won 7 seats, the Liberals won 6 seats, while the Greens won 4 seats, giving them the balance of power. Negotiations ensued between the Greens and both major parties over the formation of a government. After almost two weeks of deliberations, the Greens chose to support a minority Labor government, thereby consigning Seselja's party to the opposition benches.

At the 2012 election, Seselja moved to the five member Brindabella electorate where he received a quota of 1.8. He led the Canberra Liberals to their highest-ever number of seats, claiming eight in the seventeen-member ACT Legislative Assembly.

Federal politics
On 4 February 2013, Seselja stated he would challenge incumbent Senator Gary Humphries (who was also a former ACT Liberal leader) for Liberal Party pre-selection for the Senate in the 2013 Australian federal election. Seselja stated he would stand down from leadership of the party in the Legislative Assembly as of Monday 11 February. On 23 February 2013, Seselja won his pre-selection bid, and thus became one of the two official Liberal Party Senate candidates for the ACT.

Seselja was elected Senator for the Australian Capital Territory at the 2013 federal election. In 2014, his former opponent Katy Gallagher resigned as ACT Chief Minister to become the ALP Senator from the ACT. With the ACT having two Senate seats, the ACT was represented in the Senate by the two former territory leaders.

During the 2016 Turnbull government second ministerial reshuffle Seselja was appointed as the Assistant Minister for Social Services and Multicultural Affairs. In December 2017 as part of a subsequent rearrangement of the Turnbull ministry, Seselja was appointed as the Assistant Minister for Science, Jobs and Innovation. In August 2018, he resigned from the Turnbull ministry as part of the failed attempt to have Peter Dutton replace Malcolm Turnbull as leader of the Liberal Party and Prime Minister.

When Scott Morrison succeeded Turnbull as prime minister in August 2018, Seselja was appointed Assistant Minister for Treasury and Finance. His portfolio was changed to Assistant Minister for Finance, Charities and Electoral Matters in May 2019 following the 2019 federal election.

Seselja was appointed Minister for International Development and the Pacific on 22 December 2020.

On 12 April 2022, Seselja flew to the Solomon Islands over a military deal that the Pacific nation was to conclude with China. The deal would allow China to station navy ships and military personnel in order to protect its investment infrastructure. The mission, supported by both of Australia's major parties and taking place during a "caretaker" period in which Seselja fought for his re-election to the Australian Senate, was considered by observers to reflect strategic anxieties over the deal, which extended to allies New Zealand and the United States. The deal was signed days later.

He was unseated at the 2022 federal election by the independent candidate, David Pocock.

Political views
Seselja is a member of the National Right faction of the Liberal Party.

Seselja's political views have been described as conservative and aligned with the views of former Prime Minister Tony Abbott, although he is a republican. He opposes same-sex marriage, supports cutting penalty rates, and opposes assisted suicide. Seselja abstained from the Senate vote on same-sex marriage in November 2017, despite having promised to honour the national postal result three months earlier.

On 15 August 2018, he voted 'no' to the Restoring Territory Rights (Assisted Suicide Legislation) Bill 2015, which would have restored to the Australian Capital Territory Legislative Assembly the authority to legislate on the matter of voluntary assisted dying.

Personal life
Seselja is a Roman Catholic. He and his wife Roslyn have five children. He is currently a patron/supporter of Karinya House, a member of the Australian Republican Movement and the Australian Red Cross, a volunteer for St. Vincent de Paul, and a KeepWatch Ambassador with the Royal Lifesaving Society (since 2008); he was formerly a mentor for Menslink from 2001 to 2004.

References

External links
 
 Zed Seselja bio on Liberal Party of Australia (ACT) website
 Zed Seselja on Twitter
 Summary of parliamentary voting for Senator Zed Seselja on TheyVoteForYou.org.au

|-

1977 births
Liberal Party of Australia members of the Australian Capital Territory Legislative Assembly
Australian people of Croatian descent
Australian public servants
Australian republicans
Australian Roman Catholics
Leaders of the Opposition in the Australian Capital Territory
Living people
Members of the Australian Capital Territory Legislative Assembly
People from Canberra
Members of the Australian Senate for the Australian Capital Territory
Australian National University alumni
University of Canberra alumni
Liberal Party of Australia members of the Parliament of Australia
21st-century Australian politicians
Turnbull Government
Government ministers of Australia
Morrison Government
National Library of Australia Council members